Meryneith (beloved of [the goddess] Neith), also named Meryre (beloved of [the sun-god] Re) was an ancient Egyptian official who lived in the Amarna Period, around 1350 BC. He is mainly known from his tomb found in 2001 at Saqqara. He is perhaps identical with the high priest of Aten Meryre, who is known from his tomb at Amarna.

Not much is known of Meryneith's family background. He was perhaps born under king Amenhotep III. His father was an official called Khaut. The name of his mother is not known. In the oldest parts of his tomb Meryneith bears the titles steward of the temple of Aten (imy-r pr n pr-jtn) and later steward of the temple of Aten in Memphis. This office Meryneith might have hold at the beginning of the reign of king Akhenaten.

Perhaps around year 9 in the reign of king Akhenaten, Meryneith changed his name to Meryre. Under king Akhenaten only the sun was worshiped and Meryneith was either forced to change his name or changed the name voluntarily to fit the new royal religious politics. In his tomb at Saqqara, the name  Meryneith was in the inscriptions changed to Merire. Most likely under king Akhenaten he was bearing the titles scribe of the temple of Aten in Akhet-Aten (and?) in Memphis and Greatest of seers of the Aten. The latter designation is the title of the high priest of Aten. A high priest of Aten with the same name is well known from his tomb at Amarna. It is possible that both Meryre's are the same person. At the end of his career, at the beginning of the reign of king Tutankhamun he moved back to Memphis and changed his name to Meryneith. He now became first priest of Neith. It seems that Meryneith died in the early years of Tutankhamun's reign. Most parts of the decoration of his tomb were finished in these years. It is possible that he felt at the end of his career in dishonor and was never buried in his tomb. In the burial chambers of his tomb were found no parts of any objects of funerary equipment with his name.

References

External links 
Tomb of Meryneith/Meryre (found in 2001)

14th-century BC clergy
Priests of the Eighteenth Dynasty of Egypt
Atenism
14th-century BC Egyptian people